Barabbas is a 1953 Swedish drama film directed by Alf Sjöberg. It is based on the 1950 novel Barabbas by Pär Lagerkvist about the biblical character who was released instead of Jesus. The film was entered in the 1953 Cannes Film Festival. It was one of the biggest Swedish productions of its time. In 1961 an American adaptation of the same novel was released, starring Anthony Quinn in the lead role.

Cast
 Ulf Palme as Barabbas
 Georg Årlin as Lazarus
 Hugo Björne as Leper at Death Valley
 Eva Dahlbeck as The Mother
 Sture Ericson as Father of hare-lipped
 Sven-Eric Gamble as Christian in slave caves at Rome
 Åke Grönberg as Armful watchman at Rome
 Erik Hell as Man at Jerusalem
 Anders Henrikson as Roman procurator on Cyprus
 Barbro Hiort af Ornäs as Maria of Magdala
 Jarl Kulle as Leper at Death Valley
 Torsten Lilliecrona as Supervisor at copper mine on Cyprus
 Peter Lindgren as Soldier which assaulted gang
 Yvonne Lombard as Prostitute
 Holger Löwenadler as Thief
 Stig Olin as Member of Barabbas' gang
 Per Oscarsson as Boy
 Gösta Prüzelius as Member of Barabbas' gang
 Sif Ruud as Fat Woman
 Gunnar Sjöberg as Supervisor at copper mine on Cyprus
 Erik Strandmark as Petrus

Production
After a year of preparation, shooting started in the spring of 1952 in Israel and Rome, and then moved to Sweden for interior scenes during the summer. As the assigned cinematographer Göran Strindberg became ill early during production, the still up-and-coming Sven Nykvist, later star cinematographer for Ingmar Bergman, had to replace him for the exterior shots. Additional filming occurred during the autumn and into December.

References

External links
 
 

1953 films
1953 drama films
1950s Swedish-language films
Swedish black-and-white films
Films based on Swedish novels
Films directed by Alf Sjöberg
Films based on the Gospels
Swedish drama films
Films set in Cyprus
Films shot in Israel
Films shot in Rome
Films shot in Sweden
Portrayals of Mary Magdalene in film
1950s Swedish films